Riaz Fatyana (born 18 January 1958 in Kamalia, Punjab, Pakistan) is a Pakistani politician who had been a member of the National Assembly of Pakistan from August 2018 till January 2023. He was previously a Member of Parliament from 16 November 2002 to 16 March 2013.

Personal life 
Riaz Fatyana is a psychologist by profession. He obtained his B.A. Hons. Political Science and MSc.Applied Psychology degrees from University of the Punjab in 1979 and 1983 respectively, followed by an LL.B degree from University of Sindh in 1985.

Political career 
He started his career by being elected as a member of provincial assembly on a ticket from Muslim League-N. Later he was elected a member of national assembly on a ticket of Pakistan Muslim League (Q) from NA-94 (Toba Tek Singh). Riaz Fatyana in 2013 quit the Pakistan Muslim League (Q) due to conflict with Chaudhry Prevez Elahi and other party leaders.
During his political career, Riaz Fatyana was elected for 3 terms as Member of the Punjab Provincial Assembly 1988–1990, Punjab Provincial Assembly 1990–1993 and Punjab Provincial Assembly 1993–1996. He is a former Member National Assembly, and he was a Chairman of National assembly standing committee on human rights as well as Parliamentarians Commission for Human Rights. He has served as President of the Pakistan Psychologists Association and Senior Deputy Chief Commissioner of Pakistan Boy Scouts Association. He also served as the All Pakistan Muslim League Student Federation He has also served as the Provincial Minister of Education, Finance and information Punjab. In 2013 elections he was elected as an independent candidate. In January 2015 Riaz Fatyana joined PTI. 
Raiz Fatiana was nominated as a candidate of Pakistan Tehreek-e-Insaf from district NA-113 (Toba Tek Singh-III) and he contested against PML-N's rival Asad Ur Rehman and won the seat.
He currently serves as the member of NACTA and Chairman of Taskforce On Sustainable Development Pakistan and chairman Of Law And Committee Pakistan. Riaz Fatyana has been accused of making vilifying remarks about federal cabinet members.

See also 
 List of members of the 15th National Assembly of Pakistan

References

External links 
 
 

Living people
1958 births
Punjab MPAs 1988–1990
Punjab MPAs 1990–1993
Punjab MPAs 1993–1996
Pakistani MNAs 2002–2007
Pakistani MNAs 2008–2013
Pakistani MNAs 2018–2023
Pakistan Muslim League (Q) MNAs
Pakistan Tehreek-e-Insaf MNAs
People from Toba Tek Singh District
Punjabi people